City of Brass may refer to:

"The City of Brass", one of the stories of the One Thousand and One Nights (Arabian Nights)
"City of Brass", a 1909 poem by Rudyard Kipling
City of Brass (Dungeons & Dragons), a fictional location in the game Dungeons & Dragons.
The City of Brass (novel), a 2017 novel by S. A. Chakraborty
City of Brass (video game), a 2017 video game